A nurse practitioner (NP) is an advanced practice registered nurse and a type of mid-level practitioner. NPs are trained to assess patient needs, order and interpret diagnostic and laboratory tests, diagnose disease, formulate and prescribe medications and treatment plans. NP training covers basic disease prevention, coordination of care, and health promotion, but does not provide the depth of expertise needed to recognize more complex conditions. 

The scope of practice for a NP is defined by legal jurisdiction. In 26 states of the US, NPs have full practice authority, while in the remaining 24 states, NPs are required to work under the supervision of a physician. In Australia, the scope of practice is guided by health organisation policy and the individual's competency, while their right to access Medicare rebates requires a Collaborative Practice Arrangement with a medical practitioner.

History

United States
The present-day concept of advanced practice nursing as a primary care provider was created in the mid-1960s, spurred on by a national shortage of physicians. The first formal graduate certificate program for NPs was created by Henry Silver, a physician, and Loretta Ford, a nurse, in 1965. In 1971, The U.S. Secretary of Health, Education and Welfare, Elliot Richardson, made a formal recommendation in expanding the scope of nursing practice to be able to serve as primary care providers. In 2012, discussions arose between accreditation agencies, national certifying bodies, and state boards of nursing about the possibility of making the Doctor of Nursing Practice (DNP) degree the new minimum standard of education for NP certification and licensure by 2015.

Canada
Advanced practice nursing first appeared in the 1990s in Ontario. These nurses practiced in neonatal intensive care units within tertiary care hospitals in collaboration with pediatricians and neonatologists. Although the role of these nurses initially resembled a blended version of clinical nurse specialists and NPs, today the distinction has been more formally established.

Nurse practitioners in the United States

Education requirements
Becoming a nurse practitioner in the United States requires either a Master of Science in Nursing (MSN) or Doctor of Nursing Practice (DNP). During their studies, nurse practitioners are required to receive a minimum of 500 hours of clinical training in addition to the clinical hours required to obtain their RN. Upon completion of the graduate program, they must pass the National NP Certification Board Exam, specific to their specialization. After passing this exam, candidates must apply for NP licensure which varies by state regulations.

Although nurse practitioners are required to be licensed as registered nurses prior to obtaining their advanced practice registered nurse certification, there are several programs that combine a nursing undergraduate degree with nurse practitioner training. Other nurse practitioner programs have 100% acceptance rates.

Training pathways
There are many types of nurse practitioner programs in the United States with the vast majority being in the specialty of a family nurse practitioner (FNP). There are also psychiatric, adult geriatric acute care, adult geriatric primary care, pediatric, cardiac, women's health, oncology and neonatal nurse practitioner programs. Many of these programs have their pre-clinical or didactic courses taught online with proctored examinations. Once the students start their clinical courses they have online material, but are required to perform clinical hours at an approved facility under the guidance of an NP or physician. Each clinical course has specific requirements that vary on their program's degree/eligibility for certification. For instance FNPs are required to see patients across the lifespan whereas Adult Geriatric NPs do not see anyone below the age of 13.

Quality of care
A review of studies comparing outcomes of care by NPs and physicians in primary care and urgent care settings were generally comparable, although the strength of the evidence was generally low due to limited study duration and participant numbers. A recent study showed nurse practitioners practicing in states with independent prescription authority were more than twenty times more likely to overprescribe opioids than nurse practitioners in prescription-restricted states, the same study identified that both nurse practitioners and Physician Associates were more likely to over-prescribe opioids compared to physicians. Nurse practitioners and physician assistants were also associated with more unnecessary imaging services than primary care physicians, which may have ramifications on care and overall costs.

One systematic review suggests "that the implementation of advanced practice nursing roles in the emergency and critical care settings improves patient outcomes in emergency and critical care settings".

Job setting 
Nurse practitioners are currently employed in a wide variety of practice settings. These settings include the ambulatory, inpatient, or emergency room of hospitals, health clinics, and office practices whether private or nurse-run. In addition, they serve in schools and college campuses delivering care as well as nursing homes and assisted living facilities. NPs can work alone or under the supervision of a physician in a wide variety of specializations.

Scope of practice

Australia 
In Australia, a nurse practitioner-endorsed registered nurse has an expanded scope of practice, allowing them to practice certain advanced clinical skills within their endorsed field. As a nurse practitioner, they can complete advanced health assessments, diagnose and treat diseases, order diagnostic testing such as imaging and pathology, and prescribe medications and therapeutics. They are also able to register for a provider number with Medicare for the services they provide to patients, excluding services provided in public facilities (such as a Queensland Health hospital).

Nurse practitioner items on the Medicare Benefits Schedule, however, provide significantly smaller rebates than equivalent items for General Practitioners, leading to a higher out-of-pocket cost to patients. To claim Medicare rebates, the NP must also be in a documented "Collaborative Practice Arrangement" with a medical practitioner and the episode of care approved by a doctor. Prescriptions issued by NPs must also be verified by a medical practitioner to be eligible to be subsidised under the Pharmaceutical Benefits Scheme.

Canada 
In Canada, an NP is a registered nurse (RN) with a graduate degree in nursing. Canada recognizes them in primary care and acute care practice. NPs diagnose illnesses and medical conditions, prescribe Schedule 1 medications, order and interpret diagnostic tests, and perform procedures, within their scope of practice, and may build their own panel of patients at the same level as physicians. Primary care NPs work in places like primary care and community healthcare centers, as well as long-term care institutions. The main focus of primary care NPs includes health promotion, preventative care, diagnosis and treatment of acute and chronic diseases and conditions. Acute care NPs serve a specific population of patients. They generally work in in-patient facilities that include neonatology, nephrology, and cardiology units. There are currently three specialties for nurse practitioners in Canada: family practice, pediatrics, and adult care. NPs who specialize in family practice work at the same level and offer the same services as family physicians with the exclusion of Quebec, where only physicians are allowed to formulate a medical diagnosis.

Ireland
Ireland's publicly funded healthcare system, the Health Service Executive has the advanced nurse practitioner (ANP) grade. ANPs may prescribe medications.

United Kingdom
In the United Kingdom nurse practitioners carry out care at an advanced practice level. They commonly work in primary care (e.g. GP surgeries) or A&E departments, although they are increasingly being seen in other areas of practice.

United States
Because the profession is state-regulated, the scope of practice varies by state.  Some states allow NPs to have full practice authority, however, in other states, a written collaborative or supervisory agreement with a physician is legally required for practice. Autonomous practice was introduced in the 1980s, mostly in states facing a physician shortage or that struggled to find enough healthcare providers to work in rural areas.  The extent of this collaborative agreement, and the role, duties, responsibilities, nursing treatments, and pharmacologic recommendations again varies widely between states.

NPs can legally examine patients, diagnose illness, prescribe some medications, and provide treatments. As of 2022, twenty-six states granted full practice authority to NPs and do not require the supervision or collaboration with a physician. Twenty-four states require NPs to have a written agreement with a physician in order to provide care. Eleven of those states require NPs to be supervised or delegated by a physician; this physician may not be on site.

Licensing and board certification

Australia 
In Australia, nursing registration including endorsement of a RN as a nurse practitioner is overseen by the Nursing and Midwifery Board of Australia (NMBA) and the Australian Health Practitioner Regulation Agency (AHPRA). Registered nurses working in rural and isolated communities can apply for scheduled medicine prescriber endorsement if clinically necessary and trained, and instead become a prescribing registered nurse rather than a nurse practitioner to better meet the need of less-resourced communities. Nurse practitioners are professionally represented by the Australian College of Nurse Practitioners, as well as the Australian College of Nursing. Endorsement as a nurse practitioner in either Australia or New Zealand is recognised by both countries as part of the Trans-Tasman Mutual Recognition Scheme.

For a RN to apply to the NMBA for nurse practitioner endorsement, they must be able to demonstrate they have completed at least 5000 hours (three years, full-time equivalent) at an "advanced nursing practice" level. Advanced nursing practice is loosely defined, and not a specific role, but rather a recognised process of higher-level clinical practice within a nurse's existing scope of practice. The RN must also complete an approved nurse practitioner postgraduate master's degree, or demonstrate they have gained qualifications to an equivalent level in advanced health assessment, pharmacology, therapeutics, diagnostics, and research. Nurses applying through the latter pathway must also demonstrate the equivalent training is clinically relevant to the field for which they wish to apply for nurse practitioner endorsement in.

Canada 
In Canada, the educational standard is a graduate degree in nursing. The Canadian Nursing Association (CNA) notes that advanced practice nurses must have a combination of a graduate level education and the clinical experience that prepare them to practice at an advanced level. Their education alone does not give them the ability to practice at an advanced level. Two national frameworks have been developed in order to provide further guidance for the development of educational courses and requirements, research concepts, and government position statements regarding advanced practice nursing: the CNA's Advanced Nursing Practice: A National Framework and the Canadian Nurse Practitioner Core Competency Framework. All educational programs for NPs must achieve formal approval by provincial and territorial regulating nurse agencies due to the fact that the NP is considered a legislated role in Canada. As such, it is common to see differences among approved educational programs between territories and provinces. Specifically, inconsistencies can be found in core graduate courses, clinical experiences, and length of programs. Canada does not have a national curriculum or consistent standards regarding advanced practice nurses. All advanced practice nurses must meet individual requirements set by their provincial or territorial regulatory nursing body.

Israel 
As of November 2013, NPs were recognized legally in Israel.

United States
The most common path to becoming a nurse practitioner in the United States begins by earning a Bachelor of Science in Nursing (BSN) and passing the National Council Licensure Examination (NCLEX) to become an RN. One must then be accepted into and complete a Master of Science in Nursing (MSN) or Doctor of Nursing Practice (DNP) (most of which require at least 1-2 years of RN experience) to gain additional medical training in their specialty area. Finally, one must pass a national NP board certification exam.

Salary
The salary of an NP generally depends on the area of specialization, location, years of experience, and level of education. In 2015, the American Association of Nurse Practitioners (AANP) conducted its fourth annual NP salary survey. The results revealed the salary range to be between $98,760 to $108,643 reported income among full-time NPs. According to the U.S. Bureau of Labor Statistics, NPs in the top 10% earned an average salary of $135,800. The median salary was $98,190. According to a report published by Merritt Hawkins, starting salaries for NPs increased in dramatic fashion between 2015 and 2016. The highest average starting salary reached $197,000 in 2016. The primary factor in the dramatic increase in starting salaries is skyrocketing demand for NPs, recognizing them as the fifth most highly sought after advanced health professional in 2016.

Policy during the COVID-19 pandemic 
The pandemic expanded the scope of practice for nurse practitioners in some countries as a result of temporary legislative policy adjustments. In the US, the Trump administration waived many requirements for nurse practitioners, permitting NPs to utilize their abilities to the fullest extent in some cases.

See also

References

External links

 AANP Standards for NP practice in retail based clinics
 
 

Health care occupations
Nursing